Miguel Tudela may refer to:
 Miguel Tudela (judoka)
 Miguel Tudela (surfer)